The División Intermedia, also known as the Segunda División, is the second tier  professional football league in Paraguay. It is organized by the Asociación Paraguaya de Fútbol.

Overview
Since 1910 the second division tournaments have changed rules, number of teams and names. As of 2006, División Intermedia is the name for the second division and 16 teams are part of it. The champion and the runner-up of this league gains the right to participate in the Liga Paraguaya: Primera División, the Paraguay's top division of football. The last three teams are relegated to the third division (called "Primera de Ascenso" for teams from Gran Asunción and Primera División Nacional B for teams outside of the Gran Asunción area). The three spots left by relegated teams are occupied by one team from the Primera de Ascenso and one team from the Primera División Nacional B which is a tournament where teams from the whole country compete, giving them a chance to eventually make it to the first division.

2023 teams

2 de Mayo
3 de Febrero (CDE)
12 de Octubre (I)
24 de Setiembre (VP)
Atlético Colegiales
Atyrá
Deportivo Recoleta
Deportivo Santaní
 
Fernando de la Mora
Independiente (CG)
Martín Ledesma
Pastoreo
Rubio Ñu
San Lorenzo
Sol de América
Sportivo Carapeguá

List of champions

Segunda División

Source:

División Intermedia
Source:

Segunda División

Primera División B/Primera División de Ascenso

División Intermedia

Titles by club

List of goalscorers

See also
 Football in Paraguay
 Paraguayan football league system
 Primera División Paraguaya
 Paraguayan Tercera División

References

 
2
Sports leagues established in 1910
Paraguay